Enrique Iglesias is a Spanish singer.

Enrique Iglesias may also refer to:

Enrique Iglesias (album), 1995 album by the singer
Enrique V. Iglesias, a Uruguayan economist